Sabeh-ye Do (also Romanized as Sab‘eh-ye Do; also known as Sab‘ah and Sab‘eh) is a village in Gharb-e Karun Rural District, in the Central District of Khorramshahr County, Khuzestan Province, Iran. At the 2006 census, its population was 55, in 13 families.

References 

Populated places in Khorramshahr County